Marius Iancu better known by his stage name Morris (born in Roman, Romania on 9 September 1976) is a Romanian singer and DJ specializing in pop music, house and electro sounds. He is signed to the Romanian Roton record label.

Career
Marius Iancu picked the name Morris in school where there were "too many Mariuses". He started acting and taking drama studies at Facultatii de Teatru and continued into working in commercials, television series and films. His interest in music led him to appear as DJ and singer in various night venues in Bucharest and elsewhere, also taking part in music contests and music festivals.

In 2008, he started collaborating with the Romanian music producing trio Play & Win most notably with his big hit in Romania "Till the Morning Light" in 2008 and "Desire" in 2009 that became a hit not only in Romania, but also in Russia, Poland and Spain. He also collaborated with and gained further fame with his European hit "Havana Lover" featuring Sonny Flame in 2009 and with "Angel Eyes" with David Deejay in 2010.

Awards and nominations
 In 2009, Morris was nominated for his song "Desire" at the Romanian Top Hits Awards for category "Best Hit - Male" 
 In 2011, he won the 'Best DJ' category at the Romanian Top Hits Awards.

Discography/videography
(Selective)
 2008: Till The Morning Light
 2008: Desire
 2009: Havana Lover feat. Sonny Flame
 2009: Destiny
 2009: Lost
 2010: Angel Eyes feat. David Deejay
 2011: Because Of You
 2012: Boca Linda feat. Reea & Tamy
 2013: Awela
 2013: Siente La Vibra feat. Tamy
 2013: Reina feat. Alex Rubio

References

External links
 Official website
 Discogs
 Last.fm
 Roton label website

Romanian DJs
Romanian record producers
1976 births
Living people
Electronic dance music DJs